Vall-Llebrerola is a hamlet located in the municipality of Artesa de Segre, in Province of Lleida province, Catalonia, Spain. As of 2020, it has a population of 8.

Geography 
Vall-Llebrerola is located 66km northeast of Lleida.

References

Populated places in the Province of Lleida